Zuccaro is an Italian surname. Notable people with the name include:

 Antonio Zuccaro, Italian painter
 Ignazio Zuccaro, Italian Roman Catholic priest and bishop

See also 

 Zuccari (surname)